Megajapyx is a genus of diplurans in the family Japygidae.

Species
 Megajapyx aharonii (Verhoeff, 1923)
 Megajapyx gigas (Brauer, 1869)
 Megajapyx lagoi (Silvestri, 1931)
 Megajapyx rhodianus Silvestri, 1933
 Megajapyx solerii (Silvestri, 1931)

References

Diplura